Xidan Station is a station on Line 1 and Line 4 of the Beijing Subway located in the Xidan commercial district. The station on average has 60,000 entrances and exits per day. It was the terminus of Line 1 until it was extended eastward to Sihui Dong (E) on September 28, 1999.

Station layout 
Both the line 1 and 4 stations have underground island platforms.

Exits 
There are 10 exits, numbered A, B, C, D, E, F1, F2, G, H, J1, and J2. Exits C, D, and J1 are accessible.

Gallery

References

External links
 

Beijing Subway stations in Xicheng District
Railway stations in China opened in 1992